The seventh season of Ang Probinsyano, a Philippine action drama television series, premiered  on ABS-CBN's Primetime Bida evening block and worldwide on The Filipino Channel. Behind the scenes, the season kicked off following the departure from the show due to their candidacies in the 2019 midterm elections as well as the addition of new characters. The season ran from April 8, 2019, to June 26, 2020, with a total of 253 episodes. The series stars Coco Martin as P/Cpt. Ricardo Dalisay, together with an ensemble cast.

The seventh season of Ang Probinsyano details the restoration of Oscar Hidalgo back into the presidency as well as his and the members of Vendetta's continuing efforts to rid the Philippines of crime and corruption.

On March 16, 2020, the show was suspended from airing temporarily due to the Enhanced community quarantine enacted to curb the effects of the COVID-19 pandemic in the Philippines. Its timeslot was occupied by reruns of May Bukas Pa.

Amid uncertainty as to its future following ABS-CBN's franchise expiration and the subsequent cease and desist order issued by the National Telecommunications Commission, Ang Probinsyano made its return on the air on June 15, 2020, under the tagline "Tuloy ang Laban" beginning with a ten-episode recap after which new episodes will be aired. On the same day, its production resumed.

Plot
With the help of Lily, Vendetta successfully assassinates the incumbent President Cabrera (Edu Manzano) and restore Hidalgo back to his rightful post. Hidalgo wastes no time prosecuting Cabrera's remaining allies and making good on his promise to improve the condition of the country, seeing first hand what the people below experience. Thereafter, Hidalgo grants presidential pardon to the members of Vendetta and creates a special task force to be led by Cardo in order to combat criminality in the country.

But with Vendetta emerging victorious in its drawn out battle with Cabrera, Lily has amassed sufficient clout with the now restored Hidalgo and the members of Vendetta and intends to cash in on this debt of gratitude by keeping a close connection with the latter to mask her criminal activities, doing a double agent in the process. She also deals on both sides, she does charities and even building NGOs to help Hidalgo on one hand, while organizing several crime groups in another.

Hipolito, on the other hand, having survived the skirmish that killed Cabrera also through help of Lily, intends on getting revenge and subjecting the Philippines to widespread fear under his heel. Lily will again try to pit Hipolito and the Hidalgo administration against each other with the aim of veiling her own illicit designs. As for starters, she went to banks, just to eliminate all of Renato's accounts. Renato, betrayed once again by Lily, hid himself under Lazaro alias Uwak (Gardo Versoza) (literal "Crow"). When he recovered enough, he chased after his betrayer. He and Uwak went to the latter's casino op. He also saw CCTV footages of VIPs doing dirty on the casino, using some of the videos to intimidate other members of the circle, in the case of Javier, he collected the money he extorted, and eliminated him. Then, Lazaro proposes doing something against Lily. But first, Renato moves out to eliminate all of Lazaro's competition on his trade, then looted the enemies, from drug lords to arms dealers, and blaming it to Lily. Then, one of the syndicate head called Lily and blamed her for the killings, which she assured she has not done it. Then she meet another crime head named Nicolas Mora, which Hipolito and Lazaro wanted to be abducted and killed after the ransom was taken. They move to take him, when they spotted both Mora and Lily. Mora was captured, and Lily escaped the encounter, but not losing some of her men. Later, Renato kills Mora after he takes the ransom money. Lily made herself clear, and arms herself against Renato's attacks. Meanwhile, Renato cleans up both Mora and his wife, and counting the money he earned. Lazaro congratulated him, but on inside, he feared that Renato will betray him, or cheat on their share.

Lily later convinced the restaurant owner, Mrs. Vergara, to tell the investigators and police that the CCTVs were broken on the day that Renato kidnapped Mora to draw suspicion away that she was also there during the kidnapping.

Things came to boiling point when Lazaro found out that Renato was having more money than him. He later commanded Cedric, still loyal to him, to steal all Renato's money the night after he shared the proceeds to his guards. Renato then confronted him, and was evicted. But Lazaro has other plans, to eliminate Renato. He tried to eliminate his former friend, but was wounded and Hipolito escaped, but chased by police after he attacked a policeman at a checkpoint.

And Vendetta, joining other law enforcing units on a group that tackles crime, corruption, and violence starts their training under legal means under the leadership of Major Basco (Raymart Santiago). There are new female faces in the group: PSMSgt. Catherine Parana (Phoebe Walker), PMSgt. Tricia Almario (Stacey Gabriel), PLt. Isabelle Tiongson (Louise Gertrude), PLt. Gelyn Gomez (Ana Jalandoni), and PSMSgt. Celeste Miranda (Jachin Manere). Before leaving for training, Vendetta celebrates a send-off party. Then the following day, they start to train alongside other police force like SAF and CIDG. But despite that and their excellent achievements, some of the officers are disgruntled about the President's decision, by joining Vendetta, a group with a criminal record, on their ranks. They later graduated and both the De Leons and the Palace staff was present, also Lily treated them to her restaurant. On the restaurant, Jerome confessed his feelings to Bubbles, but the latter rejected him for "her problem". And also there, Cardo overheard the problem with their former house, involving both Konsehala Gina and Kapitan Bart. Cardo told her grandma why they never told him the problem, which Flora replied that she didn't want Cardo to worry about them especially that he was in training. After that, they relocate in an abandoned house which the owner wanted to be demolished and sold, which situated in one of Gina's gambling rings.

Meanwhile, Konsehala Gina (Mitch Valdes), alongside her minions, tried to leech themselves on President Hidalgo, but was pissed off when Vendetta and Lola Flora were closer to the President. And also her illegal rackets were not even breaking even due to Vendetta's presence. She initially called police about Vendetta, but was rebuffed by the police. Then they plan to evict Lola Flora and Vendetta once again. They forced the landlady to terminate the contract on Lola Flora's house. Then, the old woman confronted Gina, who denied everything, but when Lola Flora left, she just mocked her. And Gina provoked the owner of the house and Kapitan Bart (Leo Martinez) further, with the latter siding with the corrupt Councilor, for a right price coming from Gina and shares on the illegal rackets she has. She also besmirch Vendetta in front of the Barangay Council. They succeeded in evicting the family, but feared the backlash that Cardo can do on both Gina and Bart's positions, which the corrupt Councilor assured the Captain that Cardo and Vendetta will ignore them.

The De Leons then stayed on the Arevalos until they find a house for them, and refused Delfin's assistance and asking Cardo for help. The report about the recognition of Vendetta and Cardo unnerved but keeping a facade Gina while she counts the proceeds of her illegal gambling rings, while Bart assured his staff to be calm, as his actions will not affect his candidacy. When Cardo tried to calmly desist the gamblers from doing their illegal activities, the gamblers shrug him off, which made him snap and attacked one of the gamblers, sending the rest scurrying and reported the incident to Gina and Bart, which made the two go to the De Leon's house. A confrontation then erupts between Gina, Bart, Cardo, Lola Flora and Delfin, but the former retreated after being rebuffed, and the gamblers were intimidated. They instead tried to provoke the landlady to evict them, for the reason of terrorism and their presence endangers her earnings. Despite that, the landlady allowed them to build the carinderia, boosting her income, and she in return deal with the gamblers. They plan to rebuild a carinderia on the former gambling ring's space, so they contacted the landlady. But Bart and Gina has plans. They know that the landlady loves money, so they bribed the woman. But she was touched by the scene she saw, so she went to Bart's office to return the bribe money, where Lola Flora also went, and confrontation between them started when the landlady told Lola Flora that she was bribed by the vile duo, which Gina denied and Bart just gave the permit after hearing Lola Flora's sermon. After Lola Flora left, he pleaded to Gina, but the Councilor just ignored him. Bart wanted to run for reelection in the barangay, which in turn, made Flora file also the certificate for being a barangay captain. But Cardo discourages his grandma on the matter, and tells her to instead focus on the eatery they plan to build. Bart then goes on planning his "strategies" before election day comes.

Meanwhile, another crime group approaches led by a mysterious masked man under alias "Bungo" ("Skull") (Baron Geisler), raid a bank and kills hostages and then the responding officers after they used human shields, not after suffering heavy casualties and wounding him. Then, they go recuperating and buying weapons. There, he wanted to challenge the police force, and wanted vengeance for his twin brother killed by Ador by killing Cardo and his family. One of his henchmen, sensed his boss Dante was deranged, which the others share after he killed a cashier after taking the whiskeys they sell in the convenience store, and his obsession of vengeance against both Cardo and the whole police force. He deliberately kills policemen and making crimes public. He was the first objective of Cardo and his task force. Bungo went on buying weapons, then killed the dealers, took the weapons and money.

Also, Hidalgo tasked Cardo's task force with another problem, internal cleansing the police force, aka Task Force Agila, a counter-intelligence and anti-criminality group aimed at cleaning and purging the force of corrupt and lazy elements, and doing anti-criminal and drug ops. They started raids across several police stations, arresting corrupt officers and lazy personnel. Then they bust a cop-led kidnapping ring, rescuing the victim and arresting several officers. Then they raid a drug den after their assets confirmed the buy bust. They arrested the police officers present in the house. Then, they went undercover, to bust out a drug den, disguised as an entertainment gay bar, where a newbie province man named Domeng (Empoy Marquez) try to apply.

Renato later hid himself in an informal settlers area. Despite knowing him, the man Renato seek refuge is willing to help him in exchange of paying him. He went on stealing weapons on a dealer then plans to have money to raise an army against both Lily, Lazaro, and Task Force Agila. When Basco & his group went to investigate the area where Renato was hiding, the man denied that he knew him. But Basco immediately doubted the man and decided to follow him inside. Renato later betrayed him as he knew he might say the truth and killed him, which one of Basco's men later found out.

Bubbles, constantly tormented of her experiences at the hands of Homer (Jhong Hilario) and impregnating her made her reject Jerome's confession. But with the help of Lola Flora & the others, she coped with the issue, and tried to tell the truth to Jerome, which made the latter left confused. She later helps Lola Flora and Alyana's opening of the eatery.

Soon after the raid in the entertainment bar, the province man is being interrogated by Billy, Rigor, Chikoy, and Lando. The man identifies himself as Domingo Suarez (a.k.a. "Domengsu") and insists that he had nothing to do with the suspects selling drugs and was only applying to become an artist. Cardo arrives a few minutes later and after hearing Domengsu's side of the story, decides not to lock him up. Domengsu asks the six Task Force Agila boys on the table to offer him a "mission". Cardo and the rest agree and give him his first but unofficial "mission": to be the janitor of their office. Domengsu confidently agrees to take on the "mission". Later, as they eat at a carinderia, several thugs who extorts them was driven out by Cardo and the group.

Meanwhile, Lola Flora's family are about to officially open their restaurant called "Flora's Garden". The family was beyond excited to introduce the restaurant to Cardo and all the Task Force Agila boys.

The next mission for Task Force Agila and the rest of the PNP is announced, involving another drug den. Task Force Agila decides to use Domengsu as an asset in the mission. Cardo welcomes Domengsu to their home as the latter has nothing and nowhere to live in Manila. And also, he is assigned to be an asset to the team. After a string of accomplishments, their mission is to bust a drug ring in Sapang Bato, a natural hideaway for druggies and criminals. Cardo joins Major Basco and other police units in the operation. The mission is going smoothly, but with few casualties, until they reach the basketball court, when the drug lord and his men corner the Task Force, like a swarm of wasps. They were successful in eliminating the drug ring, but not suffering casualties because the drug lord also has the villagers on their pay.

Renato, meanwhile, stripped of everything he has, killed the man he sheltered, after the latter betrayed his position to police. Then plans to align himself with Bungo. But the deranged man has nothing to do with him. He decided to raise money again, and start his hide-and-seek mission, killing his pursuers.

Basco, who is in charge of tracking and capturing Renato, was once again under fire from his recent failure. Despite being frustrated and annoyed by others comparing them to Task Force Agila's accomplishments, Basco tells the group to focus on their mission.

Meanwhile, Diana doubts Lily's excessive assistance and begins to suspect that the latter is hiding something. So she goes to investigate Lily. Lily overheard Oscar, Delfin, & Diana talking about hunting & arresting the remaining officials that were under Lucas Cabrera by looking at the past footage of the CCTV in the palace during his regime as president. She then enters the room where the CCTV recordings are being watched & successfully bribes one of the operators watching the previous tapes to delete the footage that was showing her entering the palace. However, Elizabeth (Whitney Tyson) on the other hand, became suspicious of Lily when she saw her entering the room. Diana later investigates the restaurant where Lily & Mora met and Vergara then saw her. Fearing that the investigation on her restaurant won't stop, Vergara later called Lily about Diana being present with Lily responding with anger that Vergara should never call her again. Unbeknownst to Lily, Elizabeth secretly overheard their conversation through the phone, raising more suspicion from Elizabeth.

Lily, annoyed by Lazaro's consistent mucking and coercing, decides to help him, as he helped hers. As a measure, he helped Lily tie loose ends by ordering Cedric to kill Mrs. Vergara, which Cedric succeeded in doing, to Lily's dismay when she heard the news. He also planned to harass Lily just to make her obey him. Renato later infiltrates and confronts Lily about his money, despite the latter's insistence of taking all her riches. A fight started when Lazaro and Renato shooting each other, the latter escaped Cedric's clutches. They later plan to charm Oscar to protect their illegal businesses.

Bungo, with his newly looted weapons, relocates his hideout and plans to kidnap Lily. They almost succeeded, but Lily leaves before they arrive. Instead, the gang looted the house of everything in value. Then he went to Sapang Bato, to confront one of the drug lords in the compound, when Task Force Agila arrives. Excited about the prospect of killing Dalisay, despite his goon's protests, went on the fight. A battle ensues, policemen suffered casualties both from the goons and even the villagers helping the drug lord. But the task force, alongside other police units recovered and neutralized almost all enemies, except Dante, who was stopped by Gimo at the last moment when the former was about to shoot Cardo from behind, then fled, and the drug lord and his aide (Zeus Collins) killed.

After the mission in Sapang Bato, Flora's Garden was ready to be opened. They invited both the President and Lily, which both were accepted. Gina and Bart, jealous of Lola Flora, decides to open a rival resto, with different theme, Flora with her good food, and Gina with her entertainers. There, President Hidalgo announced that Cardo will be promoted. Unbeknownst to all of them, however, Dante, alongside his men, had followed Cardo up to his house, planning to harm also Cardo's family. This plan was implemented when he threw a grenade on the restaurant during its opening, causing chaos. Fortunately, though, Cardo managed to safely throw the grenade in a vast empty parking lot, avoiding casualties. Cardo and company suspect someone or somebody either wanted the President or the Task Force dead. Dante brews with rage after discovering that his plan once again failed, revealing the latter is targeted.

A few days after the incident in Flora's garden, Cardo was promoted twice; from Police Senior Master Sergeant to Police Lieutenant to Police Captain because of two reasons: First, because of the previously successful missions of Task Force Agila and second, because of how he saved the people in Flora's Garden from the grenade. Flora and her family remained home during the promotion.

After Cardo's promotion, Cardo and the whole Task Force Agila decide to celebrate in the restaurant where they previously stopped an extortion. That same night, however, Dante and his men had secretly followed all of them. During Cardo's celebration, Dante puts on a hat and then walked slowly into the restaurant, spying on Cardo before ordering some food. He sat on one corner of the restaurant while waiting for his food. Timo secretly followed him inside. But the two criminals departed immediately after the food was delivered. A few minutes later, Dante and all of his men approached the Task Force in the restaurant and opened fire. Cardo and Task Force Agila fought back, using the tables as shield in the process. While most of those inside the restaurant survive, three of Major Basco's men are all killed and two women from Task Force Agila, Tiongson and Parana. but Almario and Miranda survives from death and saved by Cardo and the group of Task Force. Dante's group successfully retreated right after.

Meanwhile, at Flora's Garden, Bart asked a man to put laxative in one of Lola Flora's foods using a small bottle. Afterwards, he threw the small bottle in the trash can. After 2 customers became sick, Lola Flora and the others saw the bottle in the trash can that was used to put laxative and they suspected Bart to be behind it to force them into closing & leaving the premises. She then agreed that they should investigate the matter for further proof. Gina, Bart, Francine and the duo confronted Lola Flora, but left after being insulted by Lola Flora. They later plan on how to further hurt the old woman's eatery, and evict them, so that their illegal rackets must continue.

Task Force Agila and the entire PNP mourn the deaths of Basco's men. The task force promises that they will not stop until they identify and find the suspects responsible. Bungo went on to follow up his attack on Task Force Agila and Cardo. His first victim was Chikoy (Michael Roy Jornales) after he cornered the lone policeman in a market and after a brief fight, he fatally stabbed him with a knife.

The news about Chikoy's death reaches the ears of Cardo's family and the task force the following day and eventually, to Chikoy's wife, Michelle (Denise Joaquin) and their only son Jun-Jun. While all of them mourn his death, Cardo and the task force become more determined to find the suspect. They later find out who did it through their intel: Dante and his gang, Dante's motive is also clear: avenging his brother's death at the hands of Ador, by killing Cardo and his family. They are joined by a bunch of arrogant CIDG newbies picked by Basco himself. They are PCpt. Amir Marquez (Arron Villaflor), PLt. Karlo Ramos (Mart Escudero), PLt. Louie Rallos (Josef Elizalde), and PMSgt. Eric Gabriel (Kaiser Boado). They raid Dante's hideout, but Bungo and his men already left and made their way to their new hideout before the raiding team arrives. Unluckily, Renato was there to meet up with him and he hid himself in a tinted car when he knew Cardo and the task force raided the place. While searching, they find some newspaper clippings of Cardo and his family, along with the task force, therefore learning that Dante's real target was Cardo but didn't know the real reason why. Renato successfully evades the task force's area search and as soon as they all left, he immediately exits the hideout. His determination to join Bungo's group is still strong and he will not stop until he finds them. He continues raising money by stealing and killing rich persons. He was caught by 3 rich men namely Jacob, Migz, & Lance, and brought to a bar and treats him to alcohol and drugs.

Meanwhile, Chikoy and Basco's fallen allies are about to be laid to rest. Cardo and Diana ask Lola Flora and President Oscar respectively to remain home with their families to prevent further danger. Wanting more, Bungo and his group secretly spy on the funeral, intending another follow-up attack. After the fallen policemen are all laid to rest, everyone who visited left quietly. Four policewomen from Task Force Agila, Tiongson, Parana, Miranda, and Almario, decide not to go with the rest of the task force and leave via their own sedan instead. While making their way home, the policewomen encounter a man lying on the ground. They get down their vehicle to check the man. Initially finding him injured and are about to call an ambulance, the man suddenly wakes up and points his gun towards the policewomen. But Parana reacted quickly and shoots the man, killing him. It turns out, however, that the man was a bait to lure the four policewomen into Bungo's trap. Subsequently, Bungo and his group arrive to surround and abduct them. Outnumbered and too late to call for any backup, the four policewomen are left with no choice but to surrender to the crime group.

Bungo's group drags the policewomen to their new hideout to be raped and killed later on. Bungo decides to make Tiongson the first victim and he does so by tying her on a wooden bed and assaulting her. After the assault, Tiongson berates Bungo and tells him that Cardo will eventually find and kill him. Bungo declares that Cardo will be the one who gets killed and not him and then stabs her with a knife in retaliation, killing her. Her corpse is thrown away afterwards. On the other hand, Parana becomes the second to fall victim to Bungo's dirty tactics. She is tied by Timo and is ruthlessly beaten up while Miranda and Almario are forced to helplessly watch. Timo later raped and killed Parana and leaving the rest to others.

Back at Camp Crame, Task Force Agila eventually knew the real reason why Bungo was after Cardo according to their intel. Task Force Agila inserted Domengsu to scout Dante's new hideout, after they investigated Dante's whereabouts. Domengsu finally heard where Dante's group is, then organizes a scout on his hideout. Dante and the gang however, always prepared for Task Force Agila and especially Cardo. David and Dante's mother was revealed and was having an illness. However, she hated him to the core, and wished that he dies just like his brother David for his crimes. Domengsu stoked the hideout until he finds Bungo and learns of the abduction of the women of Task Force Agila. Eventually, he is spotted by him and is taken by his men in front of him. While Bungo interrogates whether or not he is spying on them, Domengsu spontaneously attempts to outsmart him and his group by pretending that he is blind. This miraculously works and the crime group lets him go. Once out of Bungo's sight, Domengsu hurries back to Camp Crame to give Task Force Agila the information they utterly need. The task force, then, prepare themselves for another intense mission. They raided the safehouse silently, as Dante's thugs were busy with the 2 remaining policewomen. They did so until they reached the 3rd floor, where the deranged man's minions fired, alerting Timo and Dante. Their missions are to capture Bungo and rescue 2 policewomen, which Cardo did successfully and eliminates Timo. Unfortunately, Cardo was about to shoot Bungo, but was defeated by him using a knife stabbing him 3 times before firing 5 times and leave this place, leaving him for dead. Major Romero rushes Cardo to the hospital, with Cardo in critical condition. Meanwhile, Dante escaped successfully and relishes his "vengeance" on Cardo. He initially stole a motorcycle, then caused a ruckus in an eatery when he was not given broth, then shot a TV featuring Cardo's return to duty. He went to a drinking spree with his friends, but his friends wanted to betray him for money, which led him to kill his friends to avoid capture.

Cardo eventually gets out of critical state and recovers thanks to Major Romero donating blood to him. He reorganizes the Task Force to further their objective: to neutralize Bungo. Dante swears upon that he will also eliminate all Task Force Agila members, and tries to regain what he lost, but the man he wanted to be partnered declined him, so he killed the man and stole the motorcycle he saw, swearing vengeance on Task Force Agila under his breath. Renato, still wanting vengeance to Lily, Lazaro, and Cardo, uses the 3 men's (Marc Abaya, KC Montero, and Kean Cipriano) influences to fund his drive. Also, regarding the incident of Cardo and Dante, Lazaro confronts Lily about her moves, which she rebuffed. She goes in the Palace unannounced, nearly confronting the police officer in guard, until she was allowed to talk to Oscar. Then she talks with Diana gently but sarcastic. Oscar later hired Lily to be his adviser.

A few days after Parana and Tiongson were buried, Miranda and Almario return to Camp Crame. They tell Gen. dela Cruz and Alex that they are filing an indefinite leave, stating that they are unable to continue on with their duties as police officers due to the severity of the trauma they had experienced at the hands of Bungo. Dela Cruz understands their situation and tells them that the doors of the PNP are always open should they decide to serve again. The rest of Task Force Agila hear about the departure of the two policewomen and are disheartened. But they kept an understanding attitude and tells the policewomen to not forget them as they walk new paths.

Bart and Gina will go to the extremes just to eliminate Lola Flora and continue their rackets. They hired a man to spike Flora's Garden's food with laxatives, which caused them to be investigated by the Sanitation Department, which temporarily closed their eatery, much to the joy of the corrupt duo. But karma strikes when the man they hired was confronted by Wally and Elmo, prompting Francine and the minions to confront them too. A police mobile catches the man after he accidentally punches Francine, which also led to Francine's and others' arrest when Wally and Elmo pointed they are also causing the ruckus. They were bailed out by Gina, and the man given money to leave the place for good. The duo wanted to tell the issue to Task Force Agila, but the prideful Lola discouraged them. Bart and Gina was troubled by the incident, and thinks of yet another way to eliminate Lola Flora. They continue to intimidate ordinary people, by making an impostor "Bungo". When Jane kills a man inside the compound, they panicked and sent the minion duo there, to get evidences.

Task Force Agila has another mission besides Dante's capture, this time a serial killer is on the loose, killing people at random, and exclusively males. The team accepts it. Meanwhile, Renato and the rich men wanted to boost their drug dealings, so they assaulted another drug lord's place, the leader knows Renato. The group lost all their available boys and wounds one of them, until Renato eliminates all enemies. They wonder how to replenish their losses, which Hipolito replies to hire mercenaries, and he will train them himself. Jacob reunites with his younger brother, who was finished with his drug project. But moments later, he was found dead, probably a victim of the serial killer. He hushed the maids, telling to overlook this.

Cardo took Major Romero home, as Dante was still on the loose, and invited to dinner. As Cardo goes home, he rescued Jane (Judy Ann Santos) from a drunken and armed foreigner named Robert Smith. In the De Leon home, Alyana was coerced by her mother to return home, to which Alyana always refuses. Dante meanwhile, ponders how to raise a group again to exact damage once again to Task Force Agila. Major Romero tries to get close to Cardo by cooking him his favorite meal, Kare-kare, while Alyana was worried about her personal and familial issues, with her mother pleading and coercing her to go home, and suspecting Major Romero's closeness with Cardo.

The serial killer case persists, and the suspect was exclusively targeting men. Jacob was also on Jane, known as Maureen by his brother and the last person with before the death of his brother. He hunts her to exact revenge. Jane, now with Cardo on her target list, was revealed to have a multiple personality disorder, talking to herself excessively, and plays house by herself. Jacob cornered her, but she distracts his group and escapes, fleeing to Task Force Agila's HQ. Cardo decides to put Jane on his family's protection until the suspects that chased her were caught. Task Force also was on serial killer's trails, without knowing that it is actually Jane. 

Diana and Lily are on suspicion mode, which made Diana wary of Lily's closeness to Oscar, while the latter suspects Diana knew her secrets. They talk to patch things out, which Delfin overheard. Lily, trying to lure in Oscar in her hands, was disturbed by the arrival of Diana. Lazaro offered his help in eliminating Diana, but she can do it herself, which Elizabeth overheard. Diana, investigating, follows where Lily go. She caught up with her on a restaurant, with Lazaro. Lily, annoyed by Lazaro's insistence, accepted the invitation, until when Diana saw them together. Lazaro was pissed at Lily, but the latter can do something. It is also revealed the technopark that the President plans to build was inserted with groups Lily are having connections with, and Lazaro wants a share with the proceeds. Lazaro then tasks Cedric of eliminating Diana after he argued with Lily of what to do with the Secretary's suspicions.

Bungo, void of everything he has, starts assaulting and killing people at random, including several people, up to several cemetery workers. But the policemen were carefully disseminating, because of several false claims being made on them due to Bungo's large reward. Dante, wanted, with nothing in his hand and desperate, plays hide-and-seek. He was still target of renewed Task Force Agila's list.

Jane's past was eventually revealed, which caused her to have a mental disorder. She was used by her mother as a bait for men to rape her in exchange for money. She was also bullied in school and nearly abused by her teacher, also her dad raped her when he was drunk, which led her accidentally killing him. The truth about Jacob's brother's death was revealed as well. She entertained the group when the latter decides to continue the fun in a mansion in Bulacan. When Jacob's brother tried to rape her, she switched personalities and killed him. The group was alarmed by the noises, seeing her with the knife. She snapped again, getting a pistol, killing all the men inside the room.

The Task Force eventually knew the culprit, Jane, but before they capture her, she escaped the house after killing another victim. Jacob, seething with vengeance on his brother's death, decides to disregard Renato's warning, and went on chasing her. The team was also on her tail, the chase in on who will get her first. Cardo chased the men and Jane, while the Task Force was halted by Jacob's men as Jacob chases Jane. Cardo later caught on Jane's tail, after eliminating the chasers. Jane tried to flee, but cornered by the Task Force. Jane tries to reason to Cardo, switching identities from Jane, to Maureen, and lastly, when she switched to Kuya, she grabbed a pistol and tried to kill Cardo, forcing the Task Force to kill her. In her dying breath, she thanked Cardo and the Task Force in releasing her from the burden. Cardo blamed himself for near-harm of his family. Then, Gina and Bart used the incident to their advantage, they posted negative memes on Flora's Garden, and meeting the citizens to incite hatred to Task Force Agila and Flora's Garden. Lola Flora used the publicity, by making a Page of the eatery. Gina and Bart then bribed citizens with food and inciting the people to anger on Task Force Agila, Cardo and Flora's Garden. They later bribed them to sign a petition to force Lola Flora's family, and Task Force Agila to leave their barangay in exchange for free food in their eatery.

Renato and Jacob's group was on hostile mode, worsened by Jacob's insistence of hunting Jane, which he accepted. When Jacob's girlfriend, Chloe confronted him, he told her to calm down while he chokes her. Thereon, the group hated Renato more, and planned to eliminate him. But Renato caught her with Lance, which he used to as blackmail. Then, he encouraged Jacob to run his business, at the cost of the rivals. Juan (Romnick Sarmienta), a hitman with no loyalties and cahoots with foreign drug groups led by Jamil and Miller, hunts down and kills drug dealers and stole the loot. He plans to sell the wares to others.

Meanwhile, Diana was still investigating Lily and her connections and decided to tell Delfin about the matter, who told her to continue following her instincts. She later followed Lily secretly to a restaurant, unbeknownst to the latter and she caught Lily with Lazaro then after taking a picture of them for evidence, confronted them both, much to Lily & Lazaro's surprise. Lazaro later argued with Lily, telling her that he will deal with Diana instead, but Lily refused as he still was not able to find Renato.

The Task Force and CIDG get new female recruits who will replace Tiongson's squad. They are PMSgt. Hannah Robles (Franki Russell), PLt. Samantha Salazar (Diana Mackey), and PSMSgt. Lea Singson (Jessica Marasigan). But Basco's arrogant squad tells the newbies that the Task Force is weak. Their mission now is still stuck on Dante, who was rebuffed once again by one of the crime groups he approached. Dante was reluctantly reaccepted by one of his former buddy named Kalawang. He prepares to betray them when Renato and the group raided the hideout. He assisted Hipolito, the latter offering him to side with him to destroy Cardo and Task Force Agila, but first boost their business, which the former accepted. Jacob reluctantly accepts Renato's decision, despite Lance, Migz and Chloe's objections.

In the palace, Lily secretly entered Diana's office and eventually found the picture that Diana took when they were in the restaurant, proving her instincts about was indeed investigating her right, before escaping the office before Diana and Delfin could enter the Diana's office. Oscar later invited his staff, along with Delfin and Diana to dinner & announced about his feelings for Lily. Unbeknownst to Lily, Lazaro already commanded Cedric to keep an eye on Diana and deal with her, knowing for sure that Lily won't approve of it if she knew. Lily then told Diana to meet her at a restaurant to discuss their tension with one another and Lazaro later informed Lily of his plan against Diana. When Diana was about to leave the restaurant, Cedric, along with one of his men, ambushed her while wearing a motorcycle helmet. Diana fought back against the two before being held at gunpoint by Cedric when Lily came to save her in time, sustaining a minor wound on her head from Cedric, before Cedric escaped. Lazaro then congratulated Lily on how she saved Diana, with the latter knowing that she is now on Diana's good side and that Diana would stop doubting her. While on her way back to the palace, Diana wondered whether she must give Lily a credit for saving her or that was just a set up by Lily, thus still doubting her regardless. Lily just got Meilin's (Janice Hung) services, as grateful and loyal she is because lily adopted her when she became an orphan back in China.

Meanwhile, Renato, Jacob, and Dante prepared to take out one of the drug lords. After they killed all the drug lord's men, the drug lord pretended that he was hit in an attempt to surprise them. Dante decided to personally handle the drug lord to see if he was not pretending with the latter being able to shoot one of Jacob's men before being shot by Renato, leading to an argument between Jacob and Dante. Dante then apologized to Renato and Jacob while playing their game at the same time after hearing that they would get rid of him. Renato then tasked Dante to kill Lazaro and Lily, knowing that Dante would be killed and that Lazaro has more powerful men. Dante, having a plan against Renato and Jacob's group, secretly recorded the conversation of Renato and Jacob's group's plan against Lazaro and Lily & at the same time, getting rid of him as well. Dante then decided to go to Lazaro & Lily's house by himself to side with Lazaro, with Renato secretly following him to ensure that his mission would be successful. When Dante arrived at the house, he called Lazaro out before being beaten up by Lazaro's guards, then taking him inside. When Lazaro questioned Dante on his intentions, Dante immediately told him that he was sent by Renato & that Renato is the enemy so he would be killed by Lazaro. Lazaro initially distrusted him as he could be lying and shot him when he tried fighting back. Dante then showed him the video he took. Renato then presumed that Dante was dead when he heard the shot, but it turned out to be that Dante was shot in the shoulder.

Task Force Agila soon receives a new mission. They are tasked to stop a drug transaction with foreign syndicates somewhere in Visayas in which Jacob, Lance, and Chloe are included.

In the barangay, Lola Flora decided to run for Barangay Captain to fix the things that Gina and Bart made to their barangay, while Bart and his manager Gina continues to defame Lola Flora and Task Force Agila. Lola Flora later filed a certificate of candidacy to the Board of Elections, much to Gina and Bart's surprise.

Now in Visayas, Task Force Agila commences their mission as soon as night fell. They infiltrated the club in disguise where Jacob's drug transaction will take place. Once Jacob and his men are spotted, they maintained their places and waited for the right signal. Singson begins seducing Lance and they went to the comfort room to have some "time". Almost a minute later, Amir (Arron Villaflor) makes a desperate move ahead of Cardo's signal, blowing Task Force Agila's cover. Singson's cover blows as well and she is held hostage by Lance. The task force and the drug syndicate point their guns at each other while Lance, still holding Singson, slowly begins moving outside. Lance then dispatched Singson when he reached the door and shoots her on the right hip before heading out. An intense gunfight ensues. While most of the enemies inside the club and some outside are killed, including Migz. Jacob, Lance, and Chloe are able to escape. As they are escaping by their car, Alex, Amir, Karlo, Louie, and Eric chase them down on foot and shoots at them continuously. Chloe eventually takes a bullet and falls off the car. Jacob, unfortunately, fails to retrieve her due to ensuing gunshots and she is arrested. Cardo and the rest of the task force finish off the drug syndicate, including the foreigners. Singson survives but is wounded and she is brought to the hospital along with Chloe. Amir and his three other teammates arrive late and go in to check on Singson. An angry and dismayed Cardo responds by punching Amir in the face, demanding to know why the latter didn't wait for his signal with Amir replying that Cardo was too slow to strike. Major Basco then stopped them from fighting, saying that they shouldn't take their frustrations out inside the hospital and told them to go outside. In the parking lot, both Basco's men and some members from Task Force Agila dueled against one another unarmed to take their frustrations out on one another with Task Force Agila winning. Afterwards, they all shook hands for having a good fight. Later at Camp Crame, Basco's men apologized and made amends to Task Force Agila.

When Lily knew that Dante was on Lazaro's house, she was initially surprised because Renato might come back to them but Lazaro convinced her that Dante can help them find Renato. Lazaro later tasked him to steal money along with his men to test his skill, which he succeeded. But Dante later left with one of Lazaro's cars without his permission, since he wanted Cardo to die first, after he heard of the news of Task Force Agila's drug raid on Jacob. That made Lily and Lazaro furious and nervous at the same time, fearing that Dante might still be working with Renato and would expose their secrets. Lily decided to leave Lazaro's house but the latter immediately stopped her from leaving.

Lily contacted her "friend" doctor to forge a disease to distract the President and the staff on the current problems of the country and at the same time, knowing Oscar would tend to her all the time. Diana meanwhile, reacquires James's services, being her assistant in NMIG before, to investigate Lily's other connections.

Jacob later had a heated argument with Renato after the latter said that Chloe might betray and expose them, knowing how Cardo and his team interrogates the suspects they have captured, especially if the suspects would deny knowing anything, but Jacob says otherwise and knows that his girlfriend would not abandon them. Jacob then devised a plan to rescue Chloe from Task Force Agila, despite Renato and Lance's objections not to engage Cardo and his team as that group is very powerful.

In the barangay, Gina and Bart went to Flora's Garden for campaigning and at the same time, defaming Lola Flora and Task Force Agila. Lola Flora then planned to report Gina and Bart to the Board of elections for campaigning too early without knowing that two of their customers overheard their conversation. The two then went to Gina and Bart to tell them that Lola Flora and her family are planning to report them. Knowing that they would be disqualified in the upcoming elections, they immediately took out the papers they posted. When Lola Flora and Alyana are going to the Board of elections to report, they came across Gina and Bart along with their lackeys and denied the accusation. They later framed Lola Flora for vote buying so she could be disqualified from the elections, making Bart to win easily.

A few days after the drug raid in Visayas, finds a recovering Chloe under the custody of Task Force Agila in Camp Crame. After her fingerprints and mugshot were taken, she is then taken to the interrogation room with Major Basco, Major Romero, Cardo, and two other policemen on her side. Alex promises the female criminal a lower sentence should she point out Jacob's whereabouts. But Chloe vehemently denies Alex's questions and even makes an alibi that she was only a "guest" in the drug transaction in Visayas.

Meanwhile, at Alex's house, a group of thieves entered the house to steal their belongings. Cardo accompanied Alex home after work when Alex's driver wasn't responding to her calls. When she tried to contact her parents who also didn't respond, she then feared that something wrong happened. When she and Cardo arrived at her house, Cardo saw the thieves and the two eventually shot them all down. Alex then thanked Cardo for his help in saving her family.

Soon thereafter, Gen. dela Cruz called Task Force Agila and the CIDG boys for a meeting. He voices out his disappointment over the recent mission's lousy outcome and tells Basco to do something about the insubordination of Amir's group. Basco takes responsibility of what happened. Nevertheless, Gen. dela Cruz commends the task force and CIDG for being able to capture Chloe and tells them to get information from her as soon as possible. The team were later  tasked to transport Chloe to a court, but Jacob's men ambushed them with the team gaining the upper hand. Jacob was then shot by Cardo before Renato & Lance came to support him and his men. Unbeknownst to both sides, Dante was secretly hiding and watching them fight each other.

After the mission, Dante and his men ambushed and cornered Alex when she was alone in a parking lot. Alex tries to fight off Bungo's men, but is overpowered. She is abducted afterwards. Bungo sends a terrible message to Cardo and Task Force Agila that he captured Romero at Santo Hospital in Paco. Cardo and his task force has taken down Bungo's henchmen, but he fatally shoots Alex while she was tied up the roof and he escaped their clutches. Dante and his men then returned to Lazaro who then confronted him with his psychotic behavior and the latter demanded to have his share of money from Lazaro after threatening them with a grenade, then they kicked him out of his mansion because of his betrayal. Cardo then vows revenge on Bungo to get justice for the death of Alex. Oscar later urges Cardo to take Dante out as soon as possible. Dante later goes back to his home in Sitio Kasagaran and offered money to the villagers living there in exchange of being part of his group against Cardo and Task Force Agila, which the villagers accepted. Unbeknownst to them, there are two assets that were sent by Amir to investigate if Dante was there.

The operation starts at Sitio Kasagaran, where Dante and his newly acquired allies are. The Task Force fought them, but they were severely outnumbered, and the territory was too much. They eventually corner Dante. But the latter, apparently having no plans to surrender, takes Salazar hostage and threatens to shoot her. After a number of steps along with the task force who still followed him slowly, Bungo releases and quickly shoots Salazar before running for it again. Cardo gives the chase until he finds Dante in a random house. An intense fist fight begins with Cardo immediately gaining the upper hand. But Bungo blocks one of Cardo's punches and slams him onto a table, minimally stunning the latter. He makes his way to the rooftops but Cardo recovers quickly, catches up to him, and the fight continues. They fall into another random house due to a brittle roof. Bungo grabs a knife in an attempt to stab him a second time. But this time, Cardo dodges and disarms the knife and continues to throw punches and kicks to Dante. They end up in a basketball court. Cardo continues to batter a slowly weakening Bungo with more powerful punches, with each punch being dedicated to all of those Bungo victimized and murdered, including PLt. Tiongson, PSMSgt. Parana,  PCpt. Chikoy Rivera, and PMaj. Romero before Basco told Cardo to stop. The rest of Task Force Agila surround Bungo, who was too injured to make another escape. It is then revealed that Bungo had bombs strapped around his jacket. He takes out the bomb's detonator in one more desperate attempt to kill the task force along with himself. Cardo quickly grabs a pistol and fatally shoots him four times. But, gathering every last ounce of strength, Bungo detonates the bombs and he is obliterated in the explosion, finally ending his evil schemes and serving justice to his victims. Cardo and Task Force Agila successfully moved away from the explosion, with no member dead or critically injured, save for the injuries of some members, and deaths of separate units.

Meanwhile, Lily continues to pretend that she has a sickness, while Diana found out from James that Lily's doctor was also the doctor of Lucas Cabrera while he was still the vice president. Lily later coerced her doctor to forge another sickness that will require surgical operation and she was then operated, much to her doctor's dismay. As Lily is being discharged from the hospital, she then breaks her connections with Lazaro when she is contacted and recruited by the foreign drug syndicate, much to Lazaro's dismay. When Diana called Lily's doctor for more possible leads, she was told by the doctor's assistant that the doctor already went abroad to Europe.

Task Force Agila's victory is celebrated by their families, the palace, the country, and even some of the task force's next enemies. As for Renato's group, as they learn the news, they plan to dispatch Chloe before she will eventually turn against them, leaving Jacob with no choice but to eventually agree with Renato's decision to ensure the safety of their group and their business. Juan's group decided to reinforce themselves, and Lazaro's group intensifies their search for Renato.

In the Barangay, with Lola Flora getting disqualified from the election due to the frame up of vote buying by Bart and Gina, they have decided to have Alyana run instead thanks to her experience of being a reporter back then. Alyana was initially reluctant of their decision but thanks to Cardo and her family's support, she became confident and eventually filed a certificate of candidacy at the Board of Elections, which Gina and Bart immediately knew. The two corrupt officials attempt to stop Alyana from doing so, but fails. After the latter finishes filing for candidacy, campaigning on both sides took place. In the midst of the campaigning, Alyana is called by Virgie, who tells her to be careful while she runs for barangay captain as Bart and Gina are no ordinary adversaries. Alyana acknowledges her mother's concerns and assures her that everything will be alright. Their campaign sorties were different, with Alyana talking to individual people, and clean form of campaigning, and Bart with the usual dirty form of campaigning, with money involved. Despite initially opposing it, Alyana's mother accepted her daughter's decision and joined her in campaigning, while Bart's kagawads were backing out, preferring to run independent.

Soon after Bungo's defeat and PMaj. Romero's burial, Chloe's arraignment is about to take place. She is accompanied by Task Force Agila on the way to the courthouse. Unbeknownst to them, a sniper assassin named Elias, who was hired by Renato, is already there disguised as a street cleaner in preparation to silence Chloe. Renato and his group watch from afar the courthouse to make sure the job is done. While the task force is accompanying Chloe in the duration of her arraignment, Vargas is assigned to be on overwatch by the rooftops. Once the arraignment is completed in which she pleaded not guilty, Chloe, along with the task force, exits the courthouse. The assassin has his target locked. Vargas spots him and fires his sniper rifle on him. Unfortunately, Vargas' bullet misses and the assassin proceeds with shooting Chloe, critically injuring her. Task Force Agila is alarmed by the sniper shooting and they split up to respectively find Elias and to immediately take Chloe to the hospital before she dies. Cardo's group successfully takes down Elias and Chloe gets out of critical state. The latter is taken back to the CIDG hospital at Camp Crame afterwards. Cardo plans to make the media believe that she is dead so that it will be much easier for them to track and take down Renato and his group.

Back at Camp Crame, Chloe, who is still recovering from the gunshot wound, is approached by Cardo and Basco. Cardo convinces her once more to cooperate with them after telling her what had happened. Although she refuses again at first, she eventually gives in when Cardo added that if otherwise, the ones who are after her will not stop until she is silenced. She gives Cardo and the task force one condition which is to be given legal immunity from the charges filed against her. Chloe's mother is revealed later that day and becomes elated that Chloe is very much alive. She shows up to her daughter but the latter gives her a cold and bitter shoulder. Chloe resents her mother for having neglected her since she was young and tells her that Jacob helped her become who she is. The mother and later on, Cardo, beg Chloe to do the right thing and cooperate with the police. But Chloe vehemently refuses. She later agreed upon telling her that her request was granted. Task Force Agila was prepared for the operation, but first, they inserted Domeng to stake out the place.

She tells that Renato will have a major drug deal in Visayas. Juan and Jamil's group deals on both Renato's and Lazaro's group. While Lily assured Tordesillas, one of her associates that she will stall the enforcement units that will hamper their deals, in exchange of commissions. Lily meanwhile, discarded Lazaro when she knew that he became useless, but the man do not accept it. He sent a man to stalk her, while Renato sent a group to eliminate Lily, unknown to both of them, she has Meilin as her bodyguard, she eliminates both Hipolito's men and the stalker. Lily warned Lazaro to stop stalking her.

Task Force Agila, with intel came from Chloe, organizes a raid in Kamagong District's warehouses, confirmed by Domeng that Renato and Jacob will deal with Miller, Jamil and Juan. In the midst of the shootout, both groups deal casualties on policemen and henchmen respectively. Domeng enters the gunfight in an attempt to help the task force, but is immediately shot by Juan. Renato and Jacob are cornered and they watch in horror as Lance, Jamil, and Miller are taken down. After Cardo exchanges insults with the two criminals, the gunfight continues. Renato and Jacob make another run for it before they are rescued by more of their henchmen. Cardo chases down Juan and the two engage in hand-to-hand combat. It ends with Juan falling from a scaffolding, but his injuries are minimal and he manages to escape. Once out of Task Force Agila's sight, Juan brews with rage over Jamil and Miller's deaths and vows revenge against Cardo. He inquired rooms near the De Leon's home, and starts stalking them.

Back at another safehouse, Renato and Jacob begin to suspect that Chloe is still alive and was the one who sent the intel to the task force. They plan once more to take out Chloe for good. Lazaro, pissed at Juan's betrayal, commands Cedric to find him. Later, Juan contacted them why he was stalked by men, which Lazaro denies involvement. 

Meanwhile, Alyana and Bart's groups begin their miting de avance respectively for barangay captain elections. Alyana receives more supporters while Bart receives very few. Some in his group even begin to leave upon seeing his dirty tactics and it is presumed that they have switched to Alyana's side. They became desperate, and hired men to instill fear to Alyana.

Back at Camp Crame, Chloe becomes alarmed upon hearing that Task Force Agila failed to capture Renato and Jacob. Nonchalant about Lance's death, she tells Cardo to keep searching for the two criminals as they will go after her if they found she is still alive. She was to be put in a safe house, but Renato, with all safe houses list got from another former Justice Department head, starts stalking the houses.

Juan, wanting vengeance against Task Force Agila, rents a house near Cardo's house. He also plans to know who is the man behind Jamil and Miller's drugs.

Soon thereafter, the task force visit Domeng in the hospital, who has gotten out of critical state. Little do they know that Juan is secretly stalking them to find out their next move. Inside the hospital room, Cardo suggests to Domeng that he should help Alyana in the barangay instead once she wins as barangay captain to ensure his safety as their missions is very dangerous, with Domeng agreeing.

Meanwhile, Chloe was transferred to a safehouse, but she is overbearing one, always demanding. Renato decided to eliminate Chloe himself and doing it alone. He disabled the system, entered the house, killing policemen guarding the house and catches Chloe. Major Basco and General Dela Cruz goes to the safe house and saw Renato when they arrived. They intercepted and tried to block Renato's escape, but the latter fired upon them, wounding Dela Cruz and fled, with Basco chasing them. Renato then killed Chloe after she resisted him, then escapes. They plan the next move, eliminating Lily and Lazaro. 

Lily wonders why Oscar was very busy with his duties as president even without her on his side. She and Meilin then planned to lure Oscar into her so he could forget his duties and propose to her. She wrote a letter to him, telling him that she will leave for America so Oscar can focus more on the problems of the country, forcing the latter to go to her house. Oscar then stopped her from leaving and immediately proposed to her with Lily agreeing, much to the delight of Meilin and her guards.

The final day of campaign was quite one-sided, with Alyana gating the hearts of their fellow villagers with her platforms, while Bart resorts to money, and later hires some mercenaries to deal with Alyana should he lose the election. Election day came, and both groups voted. But Bart confronted both Alyana and Cardo, threatening them that if he lose, he will do harm to Alyana, which nearly made Cardo snap if not for Alyana's plea. After they left, the voters flock the precincts. Gina's minions are caught by Elmo and Alyana's supporters intimidating & bribing voters and a standoff then ensued. The Electoral Board member intervenes, forcing them to fall back and told Gina & Bart's minions that Bart can be disqualified for vote buying. Elmo and others watch the counting of votes; Alyana has won the election. Gina's minion reports the bad news to Bart, prompting the corrupt official to send in his mercenaries. Bart remains adamant to do the deed, despite Gina dissuading him.

At Barangay Pag-asa's courthouse, Alyana, along with Cardo and the rest of the family, celebrates victory and gives her victory speech. However, the celebration is cut short when she is suddenly shot out of the blue by one of Bart's mercenaries. Bubbles falls victim to the shooting as well; her pregnant stomach gets hit. While Cardo, Jerome, Rigor, and Billy race against time to bring the two wounded women to the hospital, Ramil, Bulate, Butete. Greco, and Patrick eliminate half of Bart's mercenaries and capture the other half alive with the help of the barangay's residents. At the barangay's police precinct, the gunmen deny and refuse to answer the questions Ramil and others asked them. An enraged Cardo then goes to the precinct and snap at the suspects when they declined answering, forcing one of them to finally confess that Kapitan Bart paid them. Francine, Gido, Nick and others try to flee, but are caught by Bart and Gina then forced them to stay at their side. Armed with an arrest warrant, Task Force Agila and some police officers went to Bart's House. Bart pulls up a pistol, while forcing Konsehala Gina and her minions to delay Cardo. They fail when Cardo jumped over the gate and opened it, allowing the task force to arrest Gina and the others. Cardo goes in and Bart fires his gun as the former opened the door and makes a run for it. Cardo gives chase and successfully catches him. Once in the same precinct along with Task Force Agila, Gina and Bart beg their minions and the mercenaries once more for their "innocence". But much to their utter dismay, both sides have double-crossed them and revealed that the two are indeed responsible for shooting Alyana and Bubbles. The two corrupt officials are then locked in and are fired from their job.

Alyana and Bubbles both have escaped death. But the latter's child does not survive.

Lazaro plans to take Juan once again, while Lily wants also to take Juan. While Renato wants to eliminate Juan. All the while, Juan planned on staying at the same compound as the Task Force to know who Cardo really is. Juan later called Lazaro about the drugs that he still has and arranged a meeting at the latter's house for payment. To Juan's dismay, Lazaro only paid half, with Lazaro promising to pay the other half. In reality, Lazaro plans to kidnap Juan so he could know who Miller's big boss is so he could become the sole drug cartel in the country, which was also the plan of Renato and Lily. He then orders his men to spy on Juan at his house before successfully kidnapping him and taking him to his hideout. Juan then tells Lazaro that he still had much money left at the warehouse in Kamagong, when Task Force Agila arrived. Lily later called Lazaro to tell him about her engagement with Oscar. When the two met, Juan planned to escape and saw Lily talking with Lazaro while escaping. He successfully escaped from Lazaro's hideout, enraging Lazaro. 

Alyana started her administration with Bea Malonzo (Kim Molina) as one of her kagawads. Domeng then became her assistant, but the tanods, who were once under Bart, tried to bully him, which made Bea defend him from them. Alyana then debriefed the tanods and her staff that she will rule wisely, unlike Bart and Gina. 

Due to what Cardo did to Alyana's assassins, he, Manager, Butete, Bulate, and Greco was suspended by General dela Cruz for a while for police brutality. He bade farewell to Major Basco to assist Alyana's rule until their suspension is over. They then planned to teach the tanods self-defense, emergency first aid, and disaster preparedness. 

Lily then tasked Meilin to find out what the evidence Lazaro has after Cedric contacted her. When she and Cedric met, the latter proposed 10 million to her, in exchange for spying on Lily. The two then fought with Meilin gaining the upper hand and forcing him to say Lazaro's evidence against Lily. Then, Meilin went on going to steal the evidence, while Juan wants to kill Lazaro. Her cover was blown, but with Juan's help, she fights off Lazaro. A chase between Lazaro, Juan, Meilin and Task Force Agila began, when the latter saw the chase. The duo shot Lazaro and fled when Basco arrived. Lazaro somehow survives, and got drifted. Lazaro later stole a cab and went to his hideout, and killed the doctor who treated him after he collected the money to stop him from telling everyone he survived, and plans to kill Oscar and Lily. Lily then allied with Juan, and plans to get rid of Task Force Agila, but Lily stopped him from doing so until the right time comes. Cardo invited Juan/Lemuel for drinks, not knowing that the latter is the one he fought in Kamagong, and had a great conversation along with the suspended members of Task Force Agila.

There are new neighbors in the barangay who moved in: Krista (Priscilla Almeda), Whiskey (Paul Montecillo), and her daughter, Letlet (Iyannah Sumalpong) being cooped up by Krista's possessive and abusive partner, Stanley (Robert Seña). Now, Stanley has a dark secret: he runs a loan shark syndicate preying on broke gamblers, which abducts relatives of their erring and delinquent loaners if they not pay in time, and put them into a white van. Renato then wanted to use the issue as a diversion to lie low for a while. 

Meilin then showed Lily that she captured Cedric, having the thought of Cedric being useful to them. Lily then berated Cedric for his loyalty to Lazaro and forced him to ally with them, promising that the latter will have his share of the money once she becomes the sole distributor of the drug cartel, and even half of Lazaro's riches if she gets hand of it.

Meanwhile, when Renato and Jacob heard the news of Lazaro's apparent death, they planned to inherit all of the latter's business. While Lazaro plans to kill both Oscar and Lily on the wedding day, he organized a group. After news of Lazaro's death, they plan to use drugs to control Oscar via Lily and an upcoming Press Secretary, yet to be identified, and control the country, like he did with the Cabrera administration. Meilin and Jacob met and he handed her the drugs they required to control Oscar's will. Then, Renato plans to organize his blackmail by meeting all of criminal heads that Lily contacted recently, using the info to make her a puppet.

On her wedding day, Lazaro sprung his trap, shooting Oscar, and his men thrown smoke grenades and detonating bombs. The when Lily was evacuating, his men corner her convoy. Then with tips from informants, the Task Force and police officers, raids Lazaro's house. A firefight between Lazaro and the Task Force then ensued. Oscar tries to confirm the situation personally, but fell unconscious due to the reopening of his wound and high blood pressure while on his way and he was rushed to the hospital. The Task Force had wounded members, while they inflict casualties, until they cornered Lazaro. He tries to flee and shot Lily after the latter tried to escape his clutches, then he was killed by multiple shots from Cardo and sniped by Meilin from a distance, but not overhearing the last words Lazaro said, that Lily is not the person she is known to be. Cardo then shared it with Diana and his granduncle, and later on to the Task Force and Alyana, leading for Diana to reopen her suspicions on Lily's persona. Lily was then rushed to the hospital to treat her wound. Oscar demanded that she will be beside him.

Meanwhile, new neighbors (Tirso Cruz III, Ara Mina, Rhen Escaño, Jerald Napoles) arrived in the barangay, and they are quite distrusting the Task Force Agila, revealing that the patriarch was Judge Arturo Padua, who was the judge of a case Cardo handled on Tomas Tuazon. They hired former Konsehala Gina and Kap Bart's minions. The judge distrusted and was disillusioned in every government promises.

The Task Force later started their investigation on Lily, as well as on her assistant, Meilin secretly. They asked permission from Gen. dela Cruz regarding the matter, to which dela Cruz approved, although warning them of the consequences of it as they are taking on a powerful person. When they looked at Meilin's background, they discovered that Judge Arturo Padua was the judge who handled her previous cases of murder, but the latter was paid in exchange of dismissing the cases. Major Basco later introduced a new member to the Task Force, Police Liteutenant Serene Mendoza (Kara Mitzki), to secretly spy on Meilin as Lily knows all the members of the Task Force. But Mendoza was found killed under the bridge.

In the palace, Delfin and Diana discussed on whether or not they should tell Oscar about Lily's involvement with Lazaro. Fearing that the president's life may be in danger, they decided to tell him about it regardless. Oscar then confronted Lily regarding the matter, but not when Lily became emotional due to what Lazaro did to her. Lily & Meilin then planned to get rid of both Delfin & Diana as they are obstacles to her plans then make Oscar take the drug that was given by Renato. After taking the drug, Oscar started losing focus on the things that he planned beforehand. Diana and Delfin remained vigilant, as Oscar's condition worsens as Lily made him consume the drug regularly. Renato always calls her for updates if the drug is working. She wanted him to be gone.

The white van abductions later became rampant and viral. A group of teenagers later used the issue to kidnap girls for fun, but were immediately arrested by the police. Krista eventually knew Stanley's secrets & confronted him about it. Stanley then ordered his men to kidnap her, Letlet and Whiskey. Krista, Whiskey, & Letlet planned to escape but were caught by Stanley's men. Letlet was able to avoid them. Domeng and a group of tanods, who were patrolling the area, tried to stop the van but quickly decided against it as the kidnappers were armed. Domeng was able to save Letlet so she can alert Cardo and Task Force Agila about the kidnapping.

Cedric later knew that Lazaro was alive and called Lily on why was it kept secret from him. Lily then ordered Meilin to get rid of Cedric. When Meilin arrived at Lily's mansion, Cedric said he was about to side with Renato. A duel between them then started, with Meilin successfully killing Cedric. Unbeknownst to them, Cedric had already showed Renato the evidence that Lazaro was having against Lily.

Two of the kidnapped victims of Stanley successfully escaped from his men's clutches before they were about to be killed and managed to report to the nearest police station. They immediately recognized that two of the officials were also Stanley's men from the gambling ring and immediately asked help from Cardo and Task Force Agila. A raid was performed by the Task Force. Krista and Whiskey was killed by Stanley when she resists. The operation was quite hard, most officers were shot down and grenade launchers were used against them. They secured the hostages, and Stanley was surrounded by Cardo & Jerome. He was immediately killed by Cardo when he tried to commit perfidy when Jerome tried to handcuff him. After the operation, Cardo and Alyana later told the bad news to Letlet about her mother and Whiskey.

Meanwhile, in the palace, Lily was nearly showing her true colors, as she snapped at Elizabeth when the latter was about to serve coffee to Oscar, bringing the latter's doubts & suspicions towards Lily once again. She later called the rest of the house staff to announce that she would be strict from that day forward, now that she's the first lady. Oscar also told Delfin not to doubt Lily anymore. Elizabeth later talked to Diana about Lily snapping at her.

At the barangay, Cardo and his family discussed on giving Letlet to her relatives to take care of her, now that her mother is gone and organized Krista's wake. Whiskey's relatives refused to take Letlet and blamed Krista for Whiskey's death. After Krista's wake, Cardo and Alyana promised Letlet that they will take care of her in the meantime.

Lily, Meilin, and Renato agreed to have both Delfin and Diana removed from the palace as they are not safe as long as the two were around. Renato and Lily then called Judge Arturo to offer him a position in the palace, which he agreed. Arturo's past was eventually revealed. After he gave the verdict to Tomas Tuazon, it was revealed that he called a drug lord, who is a rival of Tomas Tuazon, to take over the drug syndicate. His family was then killed by the drug lord's men and then he got revenge by killing the drug lord's family.

Cardo and his family later planned to have an outing, in order for Letlet to forget her mother's death. But a group of thugs bullies the people in the river, forcing the family to leave, but not before Cardo and the Task Force maul the thugs, the latter excusing that they left something, which Lolo Delfin knew why.

Lily later instructed Meilin to meet up with a contact, who is a drug dealer, regarding their share of money. When Diana saw Meilin leaving, she called Major Basco regarding it, unbeknownst to the former. Major Basco then instructed Mendoza on her first task on spying Meilin. Mendoza then followed Meilin to a restaurant and took a picture of her having a deal with the drug dealer, then sent it to Major Basco and his men, adding progress to their investigation on the first lady and Meilin.

Ombudsman Castillo (Ana Abad Santos) called Oscar regarding an anomaly of Delfin during the latter's time as the Police Director of the CIDG. Oscar was then surprised and then called a meeting with the Ombudsman, although he nearly forgot about it due to the drug that Lily was giving him. Castillo then revealed that Delfin was dealing with drugs along with Tomas Tuazon. At first, Oscar rebuked the accusation as he knew Delfin personally, but the Ombudsman agreed to find more evidence, leading to Oscar's suspicion on Delfin and vowing to make him pay if he is ever found guilty. Castillo later on met General dela Cruz to submit her findings. The general wanted it re-investigated, in secret. Then, Oscar, out of his judgement due to the drugs summoned Delfin, and he is also furious at Diana's absence. Delfin was called by Oscar, to face Ombudsman's charges against him. Due to the case having a strong evidences, Oscar was forced to suspend Delfin, and commanded him out of the Palace. 

Renato met up with Lily somewhere far, to plan their next move. Later, Oscar wanted to see a doctor due to his condition, as the drug's effect is kicking in. Unbeknownst to Oscar, Lily informed Renato regarding it and had the doctor lie to Oscar about his current condition, in exchange for the doctor's family being unharmed.

While Cardo and his family were having an outing, a group of troublemakers then arrived and caused trouble by harassing Bea and the other families in the resort. Lola Flora then decided to go home instead and not deal with the men. Cardo and the rest of Task Force Agila then made excuses so they can go back to the resort to take revenge on the troublemakers. After the fight, they went home to prepare for their work the following day.

Sometime later, while playing outside the house with Pacquito, Dang, and Ligaya, Letlet gets injured after timely dodging a speeding car which was driven by Jimbo. Yolly and Flora angrily confront Jimbo about his actions. But the latter simply brushed off their pleas, insultingly claimed that they are the ones who took Letlet for granted in the streets, and drove off. Letlet was taken to the barangay clinic afterwards to have her wounds treated. Cardo learnt of it when Domeng slipped. He charged on Judge Padua's home, demanding that Jimbo explain. Arthur and his wife arrogantly rebuffs Cardo, as they enter their home. Jimbo then told Cardo arrogantly that he doesn't know who he's dealing with, causing Cardo to punch him. Arturo then vowed to make Cardo pay for what he did to Jimbo.
 
Diana later takes the investigation on Meilin by herself after Mendoza was killed. She happens upon Meilin's drug deals with foreigners, calling the Task Force as backup. Before Task Force Agila move to position, Juan calls Meilin to leave the area, as the police officers are rushing in. Firefights then happen, the foreigner who was with Meilin and the Chinese drug lord was killed by Cardo and Major Basco respectively. Meilin was cornered, fled but not for long, as Diana was on her tail. They fought at the top of the building, with Meilin at the upper hand at first. But a stroke of luck happened, as she jumps towards Diana, the latter ducked, and threw her down the building, killing her. Juan was cornered by Basco, but the latter was distracted, leading Juan to shoot Basco, but Jerome and Hannah saved him in time and Juan fled to his motorcycle, taking Meilin's body with him as he fled. Juan took care of her corpse, contacted Lily to take her corpse. She agreed in a sad note. He later cremated Meilin's corpse and put the remains on his house. When Lily met Delfin at the palace, she cursed him and vowed revenge on him, Diana, and Cardo. Then, when Diana reported, Oscar fired her. Then, when Diana and Lily confronted each other about what happened to Meilin, both slapped each other, which Oscar witnessed. He then sent Diana out and told her to never return to the palace. 

Judge Padua's children were later revealed to have illegal businesses as well: Jimbo is buying and selling stolen and smuggled luxury vehicles, while Clarice runs a scam involving buy and sell RTWs on rigged prices, and was obsessed with Cardo.

While Lily was away, Elizabeth, under the request of Delfin to find out what really happens to Oscar, coerced the rest of the in-house staff to find out what Lily made Oscar drink. As they rummage through the bedroom, Elizabeth found the bottle of the drug with one tablet remaining, and went to Delfin's office to give him the crucial evidence: the tablet. But along the way, she accidentally dropped the tablet and was stepped on by Oscar, so she and Ambo decided to replace the drug with paracetamol before Lily could catch them red handed, which led to reduced headaches, but retained the rest of symptoms.

Delfin went to church to pray for his birthday. Then, he went on the bank in question. It reveals that the account that was used as evidence is real, he confronted the teller, threatening that he will make them pay. Depressed, he crossed the bridge. When he arrived home, he contemplated suicide, but stopped by his sister. On his birthday celebration, General dela Cruz and Major Basco, who were tasked by Oscar to arrest Delfin, went on to serve the search and arrest warrants against him. Cardo tried to resist, but forced to surrender, along with the rest. The group then searches for evidences. They found the cache Juan placed in Delfin's bed and cabinets along with the drugs, imprisoning him. Cardo talked with Diana and Delfin, the former met with James and Salonga. Also, Diana stopped Elizabeth and the staff from leaving the Palace after Salonga informed Diana that Elizabeth and the others planned to leave due to the Lily's abuse of them. Cardo and the group then went on trying to reason with Oscar, saying that his grand uncle was innocent, but the latter was adamant on his stance, then faced Lily when she talks. It broke the camel's back, Oscar was fully on Lily's clutches. The group went on a bar, when another group of policemen entered, a brawl happened when the police officer, Captain Raymundo, mocked Delfin. Cardo was called by General Dela Cruz to face the complaint filed against him. Cardo then snapped at his superior about what they did to Delfin. The general warned him of a possible suspension, so Cardo discarded his badge on the general's table then left. As he walks home, he passed a drinking spree on the street, one of the drunk people insulted both Delfin and Cardo, but the latter heard it, and tried to bar them from public drinking once again, but the man insulted him. He snapped, and nearly brawled with the man if not for Lola Flora's intervention.

With their newfound and acquired power, the Paduas are now arrogant, with Art now acting high and mighty, Clarice ignored several summons to the point of the complainant withdrew the complaint due to pressure, and Jimbo became more arrogant. Also, their new minions, who were Konsehala Gina's minions are spreading hate amongst the barangay citizens, nearly colliding with Yolly, if not for Lola Flora intervening, as they leave, Diana then warned the minions.

Suspended, Cardo now freely does what he wants. With Diana's intel, he initially confronts and warns the bank manager, the latter reported to Hipolito. Then, with a MMDA constable and his former partner, he acquired info on Tuazon's accountant, Eduardo Villamor, after he bought weapons and ammo from Armscor. He stalked and trailed the man, but Villamor was ready. Cardo then threatened him. Then, with new evidences that she met with Hipolito from his father-in-law Teddy, he confronted the manager again. Lily and Art wants the same thing: to eliminate the witnesses, and Cardo in the process. Art contacted Raymundo, tasking to get Cardo's pistol, and show it to him. They then commanded him to eliminate the accountant and manager using Cardo's gun in order to frame Cardo of the murders. Lola Flora went on and confronted Lily, but the First Lady was adamant on her beliefs. Lola Flora passed out and was taken to a nearby hospital. That caused Cardo to confront the President and Lily, which the former regretted that he saved both of them after a brief argument.

Later that night, after another attempt to stalk Cardo in his house along with Konsehala Gina's former minions, Clarice was harassed by a group of men on her way home. Juan overheard and witnessed the incident and alerted Cardo and the task force. Cardo rushed towards Clarice's aid along with his comrades and beat down the men. Clarice hugged Cardo afterwards as a sign of gratitude and then suddenly steals a kiss. Cardo did not immediately resist and Juan looked on from afar. Luckily, though, Alyana arrived late at the scene. She and Cardo went back to their house and began a conversation which eventually turned into a heated argument, not knowing Letlet and Yolly were in their room overhearing the whole thing. Alyana rebuked Cardo for repeatedly getting into fights just to release his frustrations regarding Delfin's arrest. Cardo, raising his voice, reasoned that he was only saving Clarice. He added that she seems to think only of herself and not what he's going through. The argument did not end well and Cardo just stormed out of the house.

Bewildered by the recent events that occurred including his argument with Alyana, Cardo mounted his motorbike and went his way to a bar to drink. Once there, he ordered one glass of beer and started drinking. A few minutes later, a politician and his group entered the bar to enjoy with some women. It soon came to the point where the politician harassed a woman and even hit her. Cardo witnessed the incident and rushed in to help the woman. He started brawling with the group of men, but the group's strength in numbers proved to be too much for Cardo and he was eventually overpowered by them. The men threw a severely battered Cardo afterwards and knocked him unconscious. Soon, he was discovered by Major Opeña who opted to take Cardo to a hospital to be treated. When Cardo came to and vehemently refused to be treated in a hospital, Maj. Opeña was left with no choice but to treat his injuries herself using some first-aid medicines she bought from a nearby pharmacy. She and Cardo, then, looked for something to eat. Thereafter, Cardo asked permission to Maj. Opeña to let him sleep over in her house as he is still a bit weakened from the beating from the bar. The female police major, who was later visibly having admirations to Cardo, agreed and later had a great conversation with him while on their way to the her house.

The next day, Alyana woke up realizing that Cardo still didn't come home. She searched the whole household for him, but to no avail. Then she bumped into Juan. Asked where Cardo is, Juan claimed that Cardo went to the Padua's mansion after Clarice kissed him the previous night. This caused Alyana to storm into the Paduas' mansion and confront Clarisse. However, her efforts were only for naught when Clarice claimed she didn't do such a thing and then Art drove her away along with threats of suing her for oral defamation of character. Art later scolded Clarice about what she did to Cardo.

A few hours later, Cardo and Major Opeña met up with Teddy and Diana in the same coffee shop to discuss further regarding Lily, Art, and Renato's notoriety and Delfin's arraignment. Cardo learned from Diana the abuses that Lily had inflicted to their friends in Sto. Niño, who were all working in the President's mansion. Then Teddy revealed that he had kept vital evidence to prove Delfin's innocence.

Lily and Renato meanwhile, moves on their own. Lily tasked Juan to eliminate both the manager and the accountant using Cardo's pistol, which Captain Raymundo stole, and Juan was successful in doing so. Then, the accountant's wife reported the incident, making Raymundo and his squad mates grin in secret. Then, the incident was tasked on them.

After debriefing with Diana, Teddy, and Major Opeña, Cardo returned home and told Lola Flora and his family about the recent events that transpired. Lola Flora noticed the bruises and wounds that Cardo sustained from the bar brawl the previous night. But the latter assured his grandmother that he is alright. He, then, went to his and Alyana's house just on the other side. Once there, he overheard Juan comforting Alyana over Cardo's "relationship" with Clarice and telling her that he would be there for her. Stabbed in the back by the one he once called "friend", an enraged Cardo confronted Juan and he started to beat him up until they reached outside the household and were surrounded by a group of bystanders. Cardo, then, demanded that Juan stays away from Alyana and that he must never show his face to them ever again. Ramil and some of the members of the Task Force later knew about it. A humiliated Juan begrudgingly obliged and walked off the household. Once back inside, Cardo and Alyana engaged in another conversation about the situation and the recent events in the past days. In the process, the former admitted being kissed by Clarice and not resisting immediately but also admitted how much he disliked it. Unlike before, Alyana showed a more considerate side and told her husband that what she wants is only for him to calm down. The conversation finally ended in a clean state. Clarice, along with Francine and Gido, later went to Alyana's house to find Cardo, despite the objections from Francine & Gido, and nearly clashed with Alyana but were quickly stopped by Domeng, Yolly, Francine, and Gido.

Lily and Art wanted more money, and Mr. Sy, a Chinese man offers money and financial support, in exchange of unrestricted imports of meat. Oscar declined the offer. Lily and Art later planned to increase the dosage of the drug that Renato gave them so they can control Oscar more. Art talked to Oscar regarding his disapproval of Mr. Sy's offer but Oscar snapped at him and before the press conference he scheduled, he later accused him and Lily conspiring against him when they talked to him about postponing the press conference due to his condition, and suffered severe headaches. He then collapsed during his press conference due to the drug's effects. The president was immediately taken to the hospital. While in the hospital, Lily and Art planned to have a body double of Oscar, because they know that the Vice President will soon take over, according to the constitution, thus ruining their plans to control the palace and the country. Lily then scolded Renato about the drug with the increased dosage, to which Renato became surprised as well and admitting that he didn't know the effects of the drug with the doubled dosage.

As night fell, Juan went back to Cardo's house via motorcycle, went in while still wearing his helmet, and showered bullets all around the household as retaliation for what Cardo had done to him. Cardo, his whole family, and some Task Force Agila members were alarmed by the shooting and he began to take action alongside the task force. Juan began to make his escape via his motorcycle, but was caught up by Cardo's group who continued to shower their own bullets towards him. Eventually, the rear wheel of his motorcycle gets shot, totaling it. Juan is then forced to go on on foot and went in a random building. Cardo and some of the task force continue to give the chase through the building. They are met by a grenade that was thrown by Juan. But they all jumped to safety as it exploded and continued the search. Cardo eventually shot Juan, but the man survived and escaped. He returned to Ernesto's house and got scolded by both Lily and Ernesto, while Cardo investigates further if it was Juan who showered them with bullets. Juan later on tried to exact revenge on Cardo by returning to the latter's place and he brought out his gun, but the man he thought was Cardo was just a passer-by. He then shoots at the police officers who saw him point his gun to the passer-by, then quickly left the scene. Unbeknownst to him, he was captured on video by a netizen to which Lily and Art then knew about. Lily later called Juan about it and then tasked him to help Ernesto on a transaction. Ernesto then told Juan about the transaction with the drug lord named Alejandro Galvez, to which Juan admitted to be a very arrogant drug lord, and told him to stay calm as possible to make the transaction peaceful. When Galvez arrived, he arrogantly demanded more money from Juan and Ernesto, which eventually led to Juan killing him along with his bodyguards, much to Ernesto's disbelief.

Meanwhile, Renato and Jacob have found a doppelganger of Oscar who will temporarily replace and act exactly like him, while the real Oscar is still bedridden and later took him to the hospital, where Oscar was confined. Lily and Art later told the media and the Vice President that Oscar is alright. They later took the fake to the Palace, while commanded her bodyguard to take Oscar to the Palace separately. Major Opeña later went to the hospital to investigate the real situation and suddenly met up with Captain Salonga, who was relieved by Lily. Salonga explained that Oscar is still bedridden. Opeña continued her investigation and eventually saw the medical staff and Lily's bodyguard in a hurry to the back door. She quickly followed them and saw an ambulance leaving from the back door, not knowing that Oscar was inside. Lily and Art later hired someone who can forge Oscar's signature in order for the import of the restricted meats, that Oscar previously disapproved, would be allowed. Renato and Jacob later tasked their men to find the chemist, whom they ordered to double the dosage of the drug for Oscar, to punish him for his mistakes and then Jacob overdosed him with the drugs, killing the chemist.

Delfin later collapsed in his cell due to what Captain Raymundo did to him and was taken to the hospital inside CIDG. Diana and some of the Task Force later knew and went to the hospital to check on Delfin. Delfin then told them about Lily and Art's visit & what Raymundo did to him then told Diana not to tell Cardo about it, as they know what Cardo would do once he knew.

Cast and characters

Main cast
 Coco Martin as P/Cpt. Ricardo "Cardo" Dalisay
 Yassi Pressman as Kapitana Alyana R. Arevalo-Dalisay
 Angel Aquino as Diana T. Olegario
 John Arcilla as Renato "Buwitre" Hipolito
 Rowell Santiago as President Oscar Hidalgo
 Shamaine Centenera-Buencamino as Virginia "Virgie" R. Arevalo
 John Prats as PC/MSgt. Jerome Girona, Jr.
 Bianca Manalo  as Lourdes "Bubbles" Torres
 McCoy de Leon as Juan Pablo "JP" R. Arevalo
 Jaime Fabregas as Delfin S. Borja
 Michael de Mesa as Pat. Ramil "Manager" Taduran
 Joel Torre as Teodoro "Teddy" Arevalo/Jose Malaya
 Lorna Tolentino as First Lady Lily Ann Cortez-Hidalgo
 Susan Roces as Flora "Lola Kap" S. Borja-de Leon

Recurring cast
 Mitch Valdes as Konsehala Gina Magtanggol
 Malou Crisologo as Yolanda "Yolly" Capuyao-Santos
 Marvin Yap as Elmo Santos
 PJ Endrinal as Wally Nieves
 Lester Llansang as P/Cpt. Mark Vargas
 Michael Roy Jornales as P/Cpt. Francisco "Chikoy" Rivera
 John Medina as P/Cpt. Avel "Billy" M. Guzman
 Marc Solis as P/MSgt. Rigor Soriano
 CJ Ramos as Pat. Patrick Espinosa
 Daria Ramirez as Auring
 Arlene Muhlach as Loring
 Ella Cruz as Lisa
 Jobert "Kuya Jobert" Austria as Pat. George "Wangbu" Espinosa
 Bryan "Smugglaz" Lao as Pat. Marsial "Butete" Matero
 Lordivino "Bassilyo" Ignacio as Pat. Dante "Bulate" Villafuerte
 Hyubs Azarcon as P/MSgt. Rolando "Lando" Reyes
 Nico Antonio as Jacinto "Entoy" Santos
 Sancho delas Alas as Pat. Gregorio "Greco" Cortez
 Lorenzo Mara as Ruben
 Rhed Bustamante as Ana
 Kenken Nuyad as Aye
 Whitney Tyson as Elizabeth
 Donna Cariaga as Doray Mendoza
 Joven Olvido as Carlo “Caloy” Mendoza
 Nonong Ballinan as Ambo
 Ghersie Fantastico as Itong
 Prinsipe Makata as Mot
 Shantel Crislyn Layh "Ligaya" Ngujo as Ligaya Dungalo
 Rhian "Dang" Ramos as Amanda "Dang" Ignacio
 James "Paquito" Sagarino as Paquito Alvarado
 Jay Gonzaga as James Cordero
 Juliana Parizcova Segovia as Francisco/Francine
 Roy "Shernan" Gaite as Gido
 Pedro "Zaito" Canon, Jr. as Nick

Guest cast

Episodes 

<onlyinclude>

 

</table>
</onlyinclude>

Notes

References

External links

2019 Philippine television seasons
2020 Philippine television seasons
Television productions suspended due to the COVID-19 pandemic